Cherry Creek (Lakota: čhaŋpȟá wakpála; "Chokecherry Creek") is an unincorporated community and census-designated place (CDP) in Ziebach County, South Dakota, United States. The population was 282 at the 2020 census.  Cherry Creek has been assigned the ZIP code of 57622.

The community takes its name from Cherry Creek.

Demographics

References

Unincorporated communities in Ziebach County, South Dakota
Unincorporated communities in South Dakota